Ali Khan Niazi (born on 14 December 2000) is Pakistani footballer who plays a defender and defensive midfielder for KRL.

Club career

Humma
Niazi made his debut for Humma in 2014–15 Pakistan Football Federation League, scoring a brace on his debut match against Mardan Blue Stars. Niazi scored his first goal in 44th minute and second in 91st minute of the game, he was also booked in the 89th minute. Niazi's second match of the season was a 1–0 loss to Lyallpur. Niazi ended his 2014–15 season with two goals in four appearances for Humma.

Civil Aviation Authority
Niazi joined Civil Aviation Authority in 2018. He made his debut for the club on 28 April, coming on as a 30th minute substitute Waseem Asghar in 2018 National Challenge Cup against Sindh Government Press. Niazi got his first full match against defending champions Khan Research Laboratories in a 1–0 victory. Niazi played in the semi-finals against eventual winners Pakistan Airforce, Civial Aviation lost the semi-finals on 4–3 on penalties. His last match for the club was third position match in Challenge Cup, where his team lost 5–1 Pakistan Petroleum.

K-Electric
Niazi joined K-Electric before the start of 2018–19 Pakistan Premier League. He made 20 appearances, and was booked 4 times during the season as K-Electric finished in the sixth position.

Career statistics

Club

References

External links
Ali Khan Niazi Soccerway
Ali Khan Niazi GSA

2000 births
Living people
Pakistani footballers
Pakistan international footballers
Association football defenders